United Liberal Party may refer to:

United Liberal Party (Chile)
United Liberal Party (Zambia)